The 2011 Judo Grand Slam Rio de Janeiro was held in Rio de Janeiro, Brazil from 18 to 19 June 2011.

Medal summary

Men's events

Women's events

Source Results

Medal table

References

External links
 

2011 IJF World Tour
2011 Judo Grand Slam
Judo
Judo competitions in Brazil
Judo
Judo